Treat Me Like Fire is a 2018 French drama film directed by Marie Monge. It was selected to screen in the Directors' Fortnight section at the 2018 Cannes Film Festival.

Cast
 Tahar Rahim as Abel 
 Stacy Martin as Ella
 Bruno Wolkowitch as Ivo 
 Karim Leklou as Nacim 
 Marie Denarnaud as Sandra
 Jean-Michel Correia as Diako 
 Henri-Noël Tabary as Romain
 Jonathan Couzinié as Franck
 Roman Kossowski as Simon
 Alassana Traore as Baba

References

External links
 

2018 films
2018 drama films
2010s French-language films
French drama films
2010s French films